Geghamasar is a village in the Vardenis Municipality of the Gegharkunik Province of Armenia.

References

External links 

Populated places in Gegharkunik Province